The Libby, McNeill and Libby Building is an industrial building on Western Avenue in Blue Island, Illinois. It was designed by Philip Larmon and built between 1917 and 1919. It originally served as Libby, McNeill and Libby's main Midwest processing plant.

History

The plant was built between 1917 and 1919. Situated on a 22 acre property at the Baltimore and Ohio Chicago terminal, it was designed by Philip Larmon and built by C. A. Moses Construction Company at a cost of approximately $500,000. Libby, McNeill and Libby moved into the building in mid-June 1918. The northernmost rear wing was completed in 1919, and served as the "Tomato Building", while the southernmost wing was the "Pickle Building". A wide variety of foods were canned and bottled at this plant, including pickles, catsup, mustard, salad dressing, jellies, apple butter, baked beans, and olives.

Libby's closed the plant in 1968. In the 1980s, the building was redeveloped as the Blue Island Industrial Terminal and would go on to house a variety of small businesses, including a fiberglass boat manufacturer and an electrical conduit manufacturer. In 2018, the building was donated to Affordable Recovery Housing, a nonprofit organization serving homeless people and recovering addicts. Affordable Recovery Housing organized free COVID-19 testing on the property, during the COVID-19 pandemic.

References

1918 establishments in Illinois
Buildings and structures in Illinois
Industrial buildings completed in 1919
Blue Island, Illinois